Ricky Vallen is a Brazilian singer.

Discography 
Albums

Video Albums

References

External links
 Official Website
 Official Sony Music Page

21st-century Brazilian male singers
21st-century Brazilian singers
Living people
1978 births